A calendar from 1940 according to the Gregorian calendar, factoring in the dates of Easter and related holidays, cannot be used again until the year 5280.

Events
Below, the events of World War II have the "WWII" prefix.

January

January 4 – WWII: Luftwaffe Colonel Hermann Göring assumes control of most war industries in Germany.
January 6 – WWII: Winter War – General Semyon Timoshenko takes command of all Soviet forces.
January 7 – WWII: Winter War: Battle of Raate Road – Outnumbered Finnish troops decisively defeat Soviet forces.
January 8
WWII: Winter War: Battle of Suomussalmi – Finnish forces destroy the Soviet 44th Rifle Division.
WWII: Food rationing in the United Kingdom begins; it will remain in force until 1954.
January 9 – WWII: British submarine  is sunk in the Heligoland Bight.
January 10 – WWII: Mechelen incident – A German plane carrying secret plans for the invasion of Western Europe makes a forced landing in Belgium, leading to mobilization of defense forces in the Low Countries.
January 27 – WWII: A peace resolution introduced in the Parliament of South Africa is defeated 81–59.
January 29 – Three gasoline-powered trains carrying factory workers crash and explode while approaching Ajikawaguchi Station, Yumesaki Line (Nishinari Line), Osaka, Japan, killing at least 181 people and injuring at least 92.

February

February 2–11 – Scheduled dates for the 1940 Winter Olympics in Garmisch-Partenkirchen, Germany, cancelled in November 1939 due to WWII (originally allocated to Sapporo, Japan). 
February 1 – WWII: Winter War – Soviet forces launch a major assault on Finnish troops occupying the Karelian Isthmus.
February 2 – Vsevolod Meyerhold is executed in the Soviet Union on charges of treason and espionage. He is cleared of all charges fifteen years later, in the first waves of de-Stalinization.
February 16 – WWII: Altmark Incident: British destroyer  pursues German tanker Altmark into the neutral waters of Jøssingfjord in southwestern Norway and frees the 290 British seamen held aboard.
February 22 – In Tibet, province of Ando, 4-year-old Tenzin Gyatso is proclaimed the tulku (rebirth) of the 13th Dalai Lama.
February 27 – Martin Kamen and Sam Ruben discover carbon-14.

March

March 5 – Katyn massacre: Members of the Soviet Politburo (Joseph Stalin, Vyacheslav Molotov, Lazar Kaganovich, Mikhail Kalinin, Kliment Voroshilov and Lavrentiy Beria) sign an order, prepared by Beria, for the execution of 25,700 Polish intelligentsia, including 14,700 Polish POWs.
March 11 – Ed Ricketts, John Steinbeck and six others leave Monterey, California, United States, for the Gulf of California, on a marine invertebrate collecting expedition.
March 12 – Moscow Peace Treaty: The Soviet Union and Finland sign a peace treaty in Moscow, ending the Winter War; Finns, along with the world at large, are shocked by the harsh terms.
March 13 – Indian nationalist Udham Singh assassinates Sir Michael O'Dwyer (in revenge for the 1919 Jallianwala Bagh massacre) at Caxton Hall in London, for which he is hanged on 31 July at HM Prison Pentonville.
March 18 – WWII: Axis powers: Adolf Hitler and Benito Mussolini meet at Brenner Pass in the Alps. After being informed by Hitler that the Germans are ready to attack in the west, Mussolini agrees to bring Italy into the war in due course.
March 21 – Édouard Daladier resigns as Prime Minister of France; Paul Reynaud succeeds him.
March 23 – Pakistan Movement: The Lahore Resolution, calling for greater autonomy for what will become Pakistan in British India, is drawn up by the All-India Muslim League during a three-day general session at Iqbal Park, Lahore.
March 30 – WWII: Former Kuomintang member and Chinese foreign minister, Wang Jingwei, announces the creation of the Reorganized National Government of the Republic of China in Nanjing.
March 31 – WWII: Commerce raiding  leaves the Wadden Sea for what will become the longest warship cruise of the war (622 days without in-port replenishment or repair).

April

April 3 – WWII: Operation Weserübung: German ships set out for the invasion of Norway.
April 4 – Neville Chamberlain, UK Prime Minister, in what proves to be a tragic misjudgment, declares in a major public speech that Hitler has "missed the bus".
April 7 – Booker T. Washington becomes the first African American to be depicted on a United States postage stamp.
April 8 – WWII: Operation Wilfred: The British fleet lays naval mines off the coast of neutral Norway.
April 9 – WWII: Germany invades the neutral countries of Denmark and Norway in Operation Weserübung, opening the Norwegian Campaign. The British Royal Navy attempts to attack elements of the German fleet off Norway. Vidkun Quisling proclaims a new collaborationist regime in Norway. The German invasion of Denmark lasts for about six hours, before that country capitulates.
April 10 – WWII: First Naval Battle of Narvik: The British Royal Navy attacks the German fleet in the Ofotfjord. At Bergen, German cruiser Königsberg is sunk by British Fleet Air Arm Blackburn Skua dive bombers, flying from RNAS Hatston in Orkney.
April 12
The Faroe Islands are occupied by British troops, following the German invasion of Denmark. This action is taken to avert a possible German occupation of the islands, with serious consequences for the course of the Battle of the Atlantic.
Opening day at Jamaica Race Course features the use of parimutuel betting equipment, a departure from bookmaking heretofore used exclusively throughout New York. Other tracks in the state follow suit later in 1940.
April 13
WWII: Second Naval Battle of Narvik: The British Royal Navy causes all 8 defending German destroyers in the Ofotfjord to be sunk.
The New York Rangers win the 1940 Stanley Cup Finals in ice hockey. It will be another 54 years before their next win in 1994.
April 14 – Norwegian Campaign: The first British ground forces land in Norway, at Namsos and Harstad.
April 16 – In American baseball, the Cleveland Indians, behind Bob Feller's Opening Day no-hitter, defeat the Chicago White Sox, 1–0.
April 23 – The Rhythm Club fire at a dance hall in Natchez, Mississippi, United States, kills 198 people.
April 27 – Mandatory Palestine and Lebanon play an association football friendly; it is Lebanon's first official match, and Mandatory Palestine's last before they become Israel in 1948.

May

May 10 – WWII:
The Battle of France begins.
German forces invade the Low Countries.
The Battle of the Netherlands begins.
The Battle of Belgium begins.
The Invasion of Luxembourg begins.
The British invasion of Iceland begins.
With the resignation of Neville Chamberlain, Winston Churchill becomes Prime Minister of the United Kingdom.
May 13 – WWII:
Winston Churchill, in his first address as Prime Minister, tells the House of Commons of the United Kingdom, "I have nothing to offer you but blood, toil, tears and sweat."
May 13–14 – Queen Wilhelmina of the Netherlands and her government are evacuated to London, using the British destroyer .
May 14 – WWII:
Rotterdam is subjected to savage terror bombing by the Luftwaffe; 980 are killed, and 20,000 buildings destroyed. General Henri Winkelman announces the surrender of the Dutch army (outside Zeeland) to German forces.
Recruitment begins in Britain for a home defence force: the Local Defence Volunteers, later known as the Home Guard.
May 15
WWII: The Dutch Army formally signs a surrender document.
Women's stockings made of nylon are first placed on sale across the United States. Almost five million pairs are bought on this day.
May 16 – President of the United States Franklin D. Roosevelt, addressing a joint session of the U.S. Congress, asks for an extraordinary credit of approximately $900,000,000 to finance construction of at least 50,000 airplanes per year.
May 17 – WWII:
Brussels falls to German forces; the Belgian government flees to Ostend.
Zeeland is overrun by German forces, ending the Battle of the Netherlands and beginning full German occupation of the Netherlands (Noord-Beveland surrenders on May 18, and the remaining Dutch troops are withdrawn from Zeelandic Flanders on May 19).
May 18 – Marshal Philippe Pétain is named vice-premier of France.
May 19 – General Maxime Weygand replaces Maurice Gamelin as commander-in-chief of all French forces.
May 20
WWII: German forces (2nd Panzer Division), under General Rudolf Veiel, reach Noyelles on the English Channel.
Holocaust: The Nazi concentration camp and extermination camp Auschwitz-Birkenau, the largest of the German concentration camps, opens in occupied Poland, near the town of Oświęcim. From now on until January 1945, around 1.1 million people will be killed here.
May 22 – WWII: The Parliament of the United Kingdom passes the Emergency Powers (Defence) Act 1939, giving the government full control over all persons and property.
May 24 – WWII:
The Anglo-French Supreme War Council decides to withdraw all forces under its control from Norway.
Hitler issues Der Halte Befehl, a stop order preventing his Panzer divisions advancing on Dunkirk.
May 25 – The Crypt of Civilization time capsule at Oglethorpe University, Brookhaven, Georgia in the United States, is sealed shut, with a projected opening date of 8113 CE.
May 26
WWII: The Dunkirk evacuation of the British Expeditionary Force begins.
The first free flight of Igor Sikorsky's Vought-Sikorsky VS-300 helicopter is made.
May 27 – WWII: Le Paradis massacre: 97 retreating British soldiers of the Royal Norfolk Regiment are executed by German troops of 3rd SS Panzer Division Totenkopf after surrendering in France.
May 28 – WWII:
King Leopold III of Belgium orders the Belgian forces to cease fighting, ending the 18-day Battle of Belgium. Leaders of the Belgian government on French territory declare Leopold deposed.
Land Battle of Narvik: German forces retire, giving the Allies their first victory on land in the war; however, the British have already decided to evacuate Narvik.
Winston Churchill warns the House of Commons of the United Kingdom to "prepare itself for hard and heavy tidings."
The Wormhoudt massacre (or Wormhout massacre) takes place with the mass murder of 80 British and French POWs by Waffen-SS soldiers from the 1st SS Division Leibstandarte SS Adolf Hitler during the Battle of France.
May 29 – The Vought XF4U-1, prototype of the F4U Corsair U.S. fighter later used in WWII, makes its first flight.

June

June 1 – WWII: Rear Admiral Sir W. Frederic Wake-Walker's flagship, the destroyer Keith, is sunk by Stukas at Dunkirk.
June 3
WWII: Paris is bombed by the Luftwaffe for the first time.
The Holocaust: Franz Rademacher proposes the Madagascar Plan.
The Weather Bureau is transferred to the United States Department of Commerce.
June 4 – WWII:
The Dunkirk evacuation ends: The British and French navies, together with large numbers of civilian vessels from various nations, complete evacuating 300,000 troops from Dunkirk, France to England.
Winston Churchill tells the House of Commons of the United Kingdom, "We shall not flag or fail. We shall fight on the beaches... on the landing grounds... in the fields and the streets.... We shall never surrender."
June 7 – King Haakon VII of Norway and his government are evacuated from Tromsø to London, on HMS Devonshire.
June 10
WWII:
Italy declares war on France and the United Kingdom.
U.S. President Franklin D. Roosevelt denounces Italy's actions with his "Stab in the Back" speech during the graduation ceremonies of the University of Virginia.
Canada declares war on Italy.
The Norwegian Army surrenders to German forces.
The French government flees to Tours.
June 11 – WWII: The Western Desert Campaign opens, with British forces crossing the Frontier Wire into Italian Libya.
June 12 – WWII: 13,000 British and French troops surrender to Major-General Erwin Rommel's 7th Panzer Division, at Saint-Valery-en-Caux.
June 13 – WWII: Paris is declared an open city.
June 14 – WWII:
The French government flees to Bordeaux, and Paris falls under German occupation.
U.S. President Franklin D. Roosevelt signs the Naval Expansion Act into law, which aims to increase the United States Navy's tonnage by 11%.
A group of 728 Polish political prisoners from Tarnów become the first residents of the Auschwitz concentration camp.
Soviet ultimatum to Lithuania: The Soviet Union demands that its Red Army be allowed to enter Lithuania and form a pro-Soviet puppet "People's Government of Lithuania".
June 15 – WWII:
Occupation of the Baltic states: The Soviet Union occupies Lithuania.
Verdun falls to German forces.
June 16
The Churchill war ministry in the United Kingdom offers a Franco-British Union (inspired by Jean Monnet) to Paul Reynaud, Prime Minister of France, in the hope of preventing France from agreeing to an armistice with Germany, but Reynaud resigns when his own cabinet refuses to accept it.
The Sturgis Motorcycle Rally is held for the first time, in Sturgis, South Dakota.
June 17 – WWII:
Philippe Pétain becomes Prime Minister of France, and immediately asks Germany for peace terms.
Occupation of the Baltic states: The Soviet Union occupies Estonia, Latvia and Lithuania.
Operation Aerial begins: Allied troops start to evacuate France, following Germany's takeover of Paris and most of the nation.
, serving as a troopship, is bombed and sunk by Luftwaffe Junkers Ju 88 aircraft, while evacuating British troops and nationals from Saint-Nazaire in France, with the loss of at least 4,000 lives, the largest single UK loss in any World War II event, immediate news of which is suppressed in the British press. Destroyer  rescues around 600.
June 18 – WWII:
Winston Churchill tells the House of Commons of the United Kingdom: "The Battle of France is over. The Battle of Britain is about to begin... if the British Empire and its Commonwealth last for a thousand years, men will still say, This was their finest hour."
Appeal of 18 June: General Charles de Gaulle, de facto leader of the Free French Forces, makes his first broadcast appeal over Radio Londres from London, rallying the French Resistance, calling on all French people to continue the fight against Nazi Germany: "France has lost a battle. But France has not lost the war."
June 20 – WWII: Evacuation of civilians from the Channel Islands to England begins.
June 21 – WWII: The unsuccessful Italian invasion of France begins with an offensive in the Alps.
June 22
WWII: Second Armistice at Compiègne: The French Third Republic and Nazi Germany sign an armistice, ending the Battle of France in the Forest of Compiègne, in the same Compagnie Internationale des Wagons-Lits railroad car used by Marshal Ferdinand Foch to conclude the Armistice with Germany in 1918. This divides France into a Zone occupée in the north and west, under the Military Administration in France (Nazi Germany), and a southern Zone libre, Vichy France.
Albert Einstein gives a public address in the "I'm An American" series, on becoming an American citizen.
June 23 – WWII: German leader Adolf Hitler surveys newly defeated Paris, in now-occupied France.
June 24
WWII: Vichy France signs armistice terms with Italy.
WWII: Operation Fish – British Royal Navy cruiser  sails from Greenock (Scotland) in convoy for Halifax, Nova Scotia (arriving July 1), carrying a large part of the gold reserves of the United Kingdom and securities for safe keeping in Canada.
United States politics: The Republican Party begins its national convention in Philadelphia, and nominates Wendell Willkie as its candidate for president.
June 25 – WWII: After the defeat of France, Hitler plans for an invasion of Switzerland, known as Operation Tannenbaum.
June 26 – Soviet calendar: The Soviet Union reverts to a seven-day week for all purposes.
June 28
General Charles de Gaulle is officially recognized by Britain as the "Leader of all Free Frenchmen, wherever they may be."
Romania cedes Bessarabia and northern Bukovina to the Soviet Union, after an ultimatum.
June 30
WWII: German forces land in Guernsey, marking the start of the 5-year Occupation of the Channel Islands.
Federal government of the United States reorganisation:
The Civil Aeronautics Administration is placed under the Department of Commerce.
The U.S. Food and Drug Administration is placed under the Federal Security Agency.
The United States Fish and Wildlife Service is placed under the Department of the Interior.

July

July 3 – WWII: Attack on Mers-el-Kébir: British naval units sink or seize ships of the French fleet anchored in the Algerian ports of Mers-el-Kebir and Oran, to prevent them from falling into German hands. The following day, Vichy France breaks off diplomatic relations with Britain.
July 5 – WWII: Operation Fish – A British convoy including HMS Batory sails from Greenock (Scotland) for Halifax, Nova Scotia, carrying gold bar and other valuables worth $1.7 billion for safe keeping in Canada, the largest movement of wealth in history.
July 6
Story Bridge opens in Brisbane.
WWII: British submarine  is sunk.
July 10 – WWII: The Battle of Britain begins.
July 11
WWII: British destroyer  is torpedoed and sunk by an Italian submarine.
WWII: Vichy France begins with a constitutional law which only 80 members of the parliament vote against. Philippe Pétain becomes Prime Minister of France.
July 14 – WWII: Winston Churchill, in a worldwide broadcast, proclaims the intention of Great Britain to fight alone against Germany whatever the outcome: "We shall seek no terms. We shall tolerate no parley. We may show mercy. We shall ask none."
July 15 – U.S. politics: The Democratic Party begins its national convention in Chicago, and nominates Franklin D. Roosevelt for an unprecedented third term as president.
July 19
WWII: Battle of Cape Spada:  and five destroyers sink the Italian cruiser Bartolomeo Colleoni.
WWII: Adolf Hitler makes a peace appeal to Britain, in an address to the Reichstag. BBC German-language broadcaster Sefton Delmer unofficially rejects it at once and Lord Halifax, the British foreign minister, flatly rejects peace terms in a broadcast reply on July 22.
July 20–August 4 – Scheduled dates for the 1940 Summer Olympics in Helsinki, Finland, cancelled in November 1939 due to WWII (originally allocated to Tokyo, Japan). 
July 21
After rigged parliamentary elections in the three occupied countries on July 14–15, the parliaments proclaim the Estonian, Latvian and Lithuanian Soviet Socialist Republics.
The Mitsubishi A6M Zero fighter aircraft enters service, so named as 1940 roughly corresponds to the year 2600 on the Japanese Imperial calendar.
July 23 – Welles Declaration: United States Under Secretary of State Sumner Welles announces that the U.S. will not accord diplomatic recognition to the Soviet Union's occupation of the Baltic states.
July 25 – General Henri Guisan addresses the officer corps of the Swiss army at Rütli, resolving to resist any invasion of the country.
July 27
Eleven British nationals, including Melville James Cox, are arrested on suspicion of spying for military intelligence by the secret police in Japan. Cox commits suicide in Tokyo on July 29, according to a report by the Japanese Foreign Ministry.
Bugs Bunny makes his debut in the Oscar-nominated cartoon short, A Wild Hare. However, it is not until 1941 that his name is adopted.

August

August 1 – WWII: British submarine  is sunk in the English Channel, by what is much later discovered to be a mine.
August 3 – The Lithuanian SSR is annexed into the Soviet Union, followed by the Latvian SSR on August 5 and the Estonian SSR August 6, just seven weeks after their occupation. Ethnic Germans will be deported to Germany.
August 3–19 – WWII: The Italian conquest of British Somaliland is completed.
August 4 – Gen. John J. Pershing, in a nationwide radio broadcast, urges all-out aid to Britain in order to defend the Americas, while Charles Lindbergh speaks to an isolationist rally at Soldier Field in Chicago.
August 8 – WWII: German general Wilhelm Keitel signs the "Aufbau Ost" directive, which eventually leads to the invasion of the Soviet Union.
August 10 – WWII: British armed merchant cruiser  is torpedoed off Malin Head, Ireland, by German submarine U-56.
August 13 – WWII: The Adlertag ("Eagle Day") strike on southern England occurs, starting the rapid escalation of the Battle of Britain air offensive of the Luftwaffe against RAF Fighter Command.
August 15 – Italy, without having declared war on Greece, sinks the Greek boat Elli (Έλλη).
August 18
WWII: "The Hardest Day" in the Battle of Britain: Both sides lose more aircraft combined on this day than at any other point during the campaign, without the Luftwaffe achieving dominance over RAF Fighter Command.
The Prince Edward, Duke of Windsor, is installed as Governor of the Bahamas.
August 20
WWII: Winston Churchill pays tribute in the House of Commons of the United Kingdom to the Royal Air Force: "Never in the field of human conflict was so much owed by so many to so few."
Leon Trotsky is attacked with an ice axe in his Mexico home by NKVD agent Ramón Mercader.
August 24 – Howard Florey, and a team including Ernst Chain and Norman Heatley, at the Sir William Dunn School of Pathology, University of Oxford, publish their laboratory results showing the in vivo bactericidal action of penicillin. They have also purified the drug.
August 25 – WWII: The first Bombing of Berlin is carried out, by the British Royal Air Force.
August 26 – WWII: Chad is the first French colony to proclaim its support for the Allies.
August 30 – Second Vienna Award: Germany and Italy compel Romania to cede half of Transylvania to Hungary.
August 31
WWII: Texel Disaster: Two British Royal Navy destroyers are sunk by running into a minefield off the coast of the occupied Netherlands with the loss of around 400 men, 300 of them dead.
Film stars Laurence Olivier and Vivien Leigh are married at the San Ysidro Ranch in California.

September

September – The U.S. Army 45th Infantry Division (previously a National Guard Division in Arizona, Colorado, New Mexico, and Oklahoma), is activated and ordered into federal service for one year, to engage in a training program in Ft. Sill and Louisiana, prior to serving in WWII.
September 2 – WWII: The Destroyers for Bases Agreement between the United States and Great Britain is announced, to the effect that 50 U.S. destroyers needed for escort work will be transferred to Great Britain. In return, the United States gains 99-year leases on British bases in the North Atlantic, West Indies and Bermuda.
September 4 – WWII: Adolf Hitler's Winterhilfe speech at the Berlin Sportpalast declares that Nazi Germany will make retaliatory night air raids on British cities and threatens invasion.
September 5 – WWII: Commerce raiding German auxiliary cruiser Komet enters the Pacific Ocean via the Bering Strait, after crossing the Arctic Ocean from the North Sea, with the help of Soviet icebreakers Lenin, Stalin, and Kaganovich.
September 6 – King Carol II of Romania abdicates and is succeeded by his son Michael.
September 7
The President of Paraguay, José Félix Estigarribia, dies in a plane crash.
Treaty of Craiova: Romania loses Southern Dobruja to Bulgaria.
WWII: The Blitz – Nazi Germany begins to rain bombs on London (the first of 57 consecutive nights of strategic bombing).
September 9–16 – WWII: The Italian invasion of Egypt commences from Libya, progressing only as far as Sidi Barrani.
September 9
Treznea massacre: The Hungarian Army, supported by local Hungarians, kill 93 Romanian civilians in Treznea, Sălaj, a village in Northern Transylvania, as part of attempts at ethnic cleansing.
George Stibitz first demonstrates the remote operation of a computer, in the United States.
September 12
In Lascaux, France, 17,000-year-old cave paintings are discovered by a group of young Frenchmen hiking through Southern France. The paintings depict animals, and date to the Stone Age.
The Hercules Munitions Plant in Succasunna-Kenvil, New Jersey explodes, killing 55 people.
September 14 – Ip massacre: The Hungarian Army, supported by local Hungarians, kill 158 Romanian civilians in Ip, Sălaj, a village in Northern Transylvania, as part of attempts at ethnic cleansing.
September 16 – WWII: The Selective Training and Service Act of 1940 is signed into law by Franklin D. Roosevelt, creating the first peacetime draft in U.S. history.
September 17 – WWII:
Hitler postpones Operation Sea Lion (Unternehmen Seelöwe), the planned German invasion of Britain, indefinitely.
British planes from HMS Illustrious, backed by battleship HMS Valiant, attack the port of Benghazi in Libya. Four Italian ships are sunk in the harbour.
This results in cancellation of the British Children's Overseas Reception Board's plan to relocate children overseas.
September 20–22 – Convoy HX 72, a North Atlantic convoy of 43 ships, is attacked by a German U-boat group (wolfpack), eleven ships of 73 tons are sunk, seven during the second night of the attack by the U-100 under the command of Joachim Schepke.
September 21 – 1940 Australian federal election: Robert Menzies' UAP/Country Coalition Government is re-elected as a minority government, narrowly defeating the Labor Party led by John Curtin. It is the last federal election to result in a minority government until 2010.
September 22 – Japan enters French Indochina: An agreement is signed in which Japan promises to station 6,000 troops there, and limit the total number of troops that could be in the colony at any given time to 25,000. Rights are also given for three airfields.
September 23–25 – Battle of Dakar – Naval forces of Free France and Britain fail to take the port of Dakar in French West Africa from Vichy France.
September 25 – Occupation of Norway by Nazi Germany: German Reichskommissar Josef Terboven appoints a provisional council of state from the pro-Nazi Nasjonal Samling party, under Vidkun Quisling, as a puppet government for Norway.
September 26 – A group of Japanese officers, in violation of an agreement, signed 4 days earlier with French Indochina, take Đồng Đăng and Lam Sơn, with 40 Franco-Vietnamese troops killed and around 1,000 deserting. The same day the United States imposes a total embargo on all scrap metal shipments to Japan.
September 27 – WWII: Germany, Italy and Japan sign the Tripartite Pact.
September 30 (night to October 1) – Arsonists from the Hitler Youth destroy the Great Synagogue of Strasbourg.

October

October 1 – The first section of the Pennsylvania Turnpike, the United States' first long-distance controlled-access highway, is opened.
October 11 – Portuguese-born performer Carmen Miranda makes her American film debut in Down Argentine Way, one of the first films produced to promote the Good Neighbor policy.
October 14 – The Balham tube station disaster in London, England, occurs during the Nazi Luftwaffe air raids on Great Britain.
October 15 – Charlie Chaplin releases his controversial wartime satire The Great Dictator, nine months after The Three Stooges' You Nazty Spy!.
October 16
The draft registration of approximately 16 million men begins in the United States.
Nazi Governor-General Hans Frank establishes the Warsaw Ghetto.
October 18–19 – WWII: Thirty-two ships are sunk from Convoy SC 7 and Convoy HX 79 by the most effective "wolfpack" of the war, including Otto Kretschmer, Günther Prien and Joachim Schepke.
October 26–28 – WWII: , serving as a troopship under the British flag, is bombed, torpedoed and sunk off the Donegal coast, with the loss of 45 lives. At 42,348 GRT, she is the war's largest merchant ship loss.
October 28 – WWII: Italian troops invade Greece, meeting strong resistance from Greek troops and civilians. This action signals the beginning of the Balkan Campaign.
October 29 – The Selective Service System lottery is held in Washington, D.C..

November

November – In Cambodia, the Khmer Issarak is formed to overthrow the French Army within the nation.
November 2–8 – WWII: (Greco-Italian War): Battle of Elaia–Kalamas in Epirus: Outnumbered Greek forces repel the Italian Army.
November 2 – German submarine U-69 is commissioned, the first Type VIIC U-boat of Nazi Germany's Kriegsmarine, which will become its most numerous class, with 568 commissioned during the War.
November 5
1940 United States presidential election: Democrat incumbent Franklin D. Roosevelt decisively defeats Republican challenger Wendell Willkie, and becomes the United States' first and only third-term president.
WWII: Allied Convoy HX 84 is attacked by German cruiser Admiral Scheer in the North Atlantic; the sacrifice of escorting British armed merchant cruiser  under Capt. Edward Fegen and  enables a majority of the ships (including tanker ) to escape.
November 6 – Agatha Christie's mystery novel And Then There Were None is published in book form, in the United States.
November 7 – In Tacoma, Washington, the -long center span of the Tacoma Narrows Bridge (known as Galloping Gertie) collapses.
November 8 – WWII:  is sunk by a naval mine off Cape Otway, Australia (the first United States Merchant Marine loss of the war).
November 9 – Joaquín Rodrigo's Concierto de Aranjuez premieres in Barcelona, Spain.
November 10 – 1940 Vrancea earthquake: An earthquake in Romania kills 1,000.
November 11
WWII: The British Royal Navy launches the first aircraft carrier strike in history, on the Italian battleship fleet anchored at Taranto Naval Base.
Armistice Day Blizzard: An unexpected blizzard kills 144 in the Midwestern United States.
November 13 – The Walt Disney animated film Fantasia, the first commercial film shown in stereophonic sound, has its world premiere at the Broadway Theatre in New York City. It is the first box office failure for Disney, though it recoups its cost years later and becomes one of the most highly regarded of Disney's films.
November 14 – WWII: Coventry Blitz: The city centre of Coventry, England is destroyed by 500 Luftwaffe bombers; 150,000 fire bombs, 503 tons of high explosives, and 130 parachute mines level 60,000 of the city's 75,000 buildings; 568 people are killed. The city's cathedral is gutted.
November 15 – Abbott and Costello make their film debut, in One Night in the Tropics.
November 16
WWII: In response to Germany levelling Coventry 2 days before, the Royal Air Force begins to bomb Hamburg (by war's end, 50,000 Hamburg residents will have died from Allied attacks).
An unexploded pipe bomb is found in the Consolidated Edison office building (only years later is the culprit, George Metesky, apprehended).
The Jamaica Association of Local Government Officers is founded.
November 17 – The Tartu Art Museum is established in Tartu, Estonia.
November 18 – WWII: German leader Adolf Hitler and Italian Foreign Minister Galeazzo Ciano meet to discuss Benito Mussolini's disastrous invasion of Greece.
November 20 – WWII: Hungary, Romania and Slovakia join the Axis powers.
November 25
Patria disaster: As British authorities attempt to deport Jewish refugees (originating from German-occupied Europe) from Mandatory Palestine to Mauritius, aboard the requisitioned emigrant liner  at Haifa, the Jewish paramilitary organization Haganah sinks the ship with a bomb, killing around 250 refugees and crew.
The de Havilland Mosquito and Martin B-26 Marauder military aircraft both make their first flights.
Woody Woodpecker makes his debut in the animated short, Knock Knock. It is not until 1941 that his current name is adopted.
November 26–27 – Jilava Massacre: In Romania, coup leader General Ion Antonescu's Iron Guard arrests and executes over 60 of exiled King Carol II of Romania's aides, starting at a penitentiary near Bucharest. Among the dead is former minister and acclaimed historian Nicolae Iorga.
November 27 – WWII: Battle of Cape Spartivento: The British Royal Navy and Italian Regia Marina battle to a draw.

December

December – Timely Comics' Captain America Comics #1 (cover dated March 1941), first appearance of Captain America and Bucky, hits newsstands in the United States.
December 1 – Manuel Ávila Camacho takes office, as President of Mexico.
December 6 – British submarine  is sunk near Taranto.
December 8 – The Chicago Bears, in what will become the most one-sided victory in National Football League history, defeat the Washington Redskins 73–0 in the 1940 NFL Championship Game.
December 9 – WWII: Operation Compass – British forces in North Africa begin their first major offensive, with an attack on Italian forces at Sidi Barrani, Egypt.
December 12 and December 15 – WWII: Sheffield Blitz ("Operation Crucible"): The Yorkshire city of Sheffield is badly damaged by German air-raids.
December 14
WWII British destroyers  and  sink an Italian submarine off Bardia.
Royal Navy Fairey Swordfish based on Malta bomb Tripoli.
Plutonium is first synthesized in the laboratory, by a team led by Glenn T. Seaborg and Edwin McMillan, at the University of California, Berkeley.
December 16 – WWII: Operation Abigail Rachel: The RAF bombs Mannheim.
December 17 – President Roosevelt, at his regular press conference, first sets forth the outline of his plan to send aid to Great Britain, which will become known as Lend-Lease.
December 23 – WWII: Winston Churchill, in a broadcast address to the people of Italy, blames Benito Mussolini for leading his nation to war against the British, contrary to Italy's historic friendship with them: "One man has arrayed the trustees and inheritors of ancient Rome upon the side of the ferocious pagan barbarians."
December 24 – Mahatma Gandhi, Indian spiritual non-violence leader, writes his second letter to Adolf Hitler, addressing him as "My friend", and requesting him to stop the war Germany had begun.
December 25 – The German cruiser Admiral Hipper attacks a British shipping convoy (WS 5A) en route to Sierra Leone 700 miles (1,100 km) west of Cape Finisterre in Spain. Admiral Hipper sinks one ship but has to withdraw with engine trouble.
December 27 – The German auxiliary cruiser Komet shells and heavily damages the phosphate production facilities on Nauru while flying the Japanese flag. The bombardment lasts an hour, and it causes the loss of 13,000 tons of oil.
December 29
Franklin D. Roosevelt, in a fireside chat to the nation, declares that the United States must become "the great arsenal of democracy."
WWII: "Second Great Fire of London": The Luftwaffe carries out a massive incendiary bombing raid, starting 1,500 fires. Many famous buildings, including the Guildhall and Trinity House, are either damaged or destroyed.

Date unknown
In Korea, the Hunminjeongeum (1446) is discovered, explaining the basis of the Hangul alphabet.
Walter Knott begins construction of a California ghost town replica, which soon evolves into Knott's Berry Farm.

Births

January

January 1
Ippei Kuri, Japanese manga artist, animator and entrepreneur, co-founder of Tatsunoko Productions
January 2
Jim Bakker, American televangelist, ex-husband of Tammy Faye
S. R. Srinivasa Varadhan, Indian-American mathematician
January 3 – Thelma Schoonmaker, Algerian-born American film editor
January 4
Helmut Jahn, German-American architect (d. 2021)
Brian Josephson, Welsh physicist, Nobel Prize laureate
Gao Xingjian, Chinese-born writer, Nobel Prize laureate
January 9 – Miguel Ángel Rodríguez, Costa Rican politician, lawyer, economist and businessman
January 14 – Julian Bond, African-American civil rights activist (d. 2015)
January 16 – Franz Müntefering, German politician
January 17
Kipchoge Keino, Kenyan athlete
Tabaré Vázquez, President of Uruguay (d. 2020)
Nerses Bedros XIX Tarmouni, Armenian Catholic Patriarch of Cilicia (d. 2015)
January 18 – Pedro Rodríguez, Mexican racing driver (d. 1971)
January 19
Paolo Borsellino, Italian judge and magistrate (d. 1992) 
Mike Reid, English actor (d. 2007)
Linda Sorenson, Canadian actress
January 20
Carol Heiss, American figure skater
Krishnam Raju, Indian actor and politician
Tay Eng Soon,  Singaporean politician (d. 1993)
January 21 – Jack Nicklaus, American golfer
January 22 – John Hurt, English actor (d. 2017)
January 24 – Joachim Gauck, German politician, 11th President of Germany
January 27
Brian O'Leary, American scientist, author and NASA astronaut (d. 2011)
James Cromwell, American actor
Petru Lucinschi, Moldovan politician, 2nd President of Moldova
January 28 – Carlos Slim, Mexican businessman
January 29 
Katharine Ross, American actress
Kunimitsu Takahashi, Japanese motorcycle racer and racing driver (d. 2022)

February

 

February 1 – Ajmer Singh, Indian athlete, educator (d. 2010)
February 2
Odell Brown, American jazz organist (d. 2011)
Sir David Jason, English actor
February 4 – George A. Romero, American film writer, director (d. 2017)
February 5 – H. R. Giger, Swiss artist (d. 2014)
February 6 – Tom Brokaw, American television journalist and author
February 7 – Tony Tan, 7th President of Singapore
February 9
J. M. Coetzee, South African writer, Nobel Prize laureate
Seamus Deane, Irish poet and novelist (d. 2021)
February 12
Richard Lynch, American actor (d. 2012)
Robert Saladrigas, Spanish writer, journalist and literary critic (d. 2018)
February 15 – Hamzah Haz, Indonesian politician, 9th Vice President of Indonesia
February 17
Matija Barl, Slovenian actor, producer and translator (d. 2018)
Vicente Fernández, Mexican actor and singer (d. 2021)
Willi Holdorf, German Olympic decathlete (d. 2020)
Chris Newman, American sound mixer, director
Gene Pitney, American singer (d. 2006)
February 18 – Fabrizio De André, Italian singer, songwriter (d. 1999)
February 19 – Smokey Robinson, African-American musician
February 20 – Jimmy Greaves, English footballer (d. 2021)
February 21 – John Lewis, African-American politician, civil rights activist (d. 2020)
February 22
Aracy Balabanian, Brazilian actress
Judy Cornwell, English actress
Billy Name (William G. Linich), American photographer, Warhol archivist (d. 2016)
Chet Walker, American basketball player
February 23 – Peter Fonda, American actor (Easy Rider) (d. 2019)
February 24
Pete Duel, American actor (Alias Smith and Jones) (d. 1971)
Jimmy Ellis, African-American professional boxer (d. 2014)
Denis Law, Scottish footballer
February 25 – Jesús López Cobos, Spanish-born conductor (d. 2018)
February 27 – Bill Hunter, Australian actor (d. 2011)
February 28
Mario Andretti, American race car driver
Joe South, American singer, songwriter (Games People Play) (d. 2012)
February 29 – Billy Turner, American horse trainer (d. 2021)

March

March 1
David Broome, Welsh Show Jumper
Nuala O'Faolain, Irish journalist, author (d. 2008)
March 2 – Billy McNeill, Scottish football player and manager (d. 2019)
March 3
Germán Castro Caycedo, Colombian writer, journalist
March 4 – Vladimir Morosov, Soviet athlete
March 5 – Anton Fliegerbauer, West German police officer (d. 1972)
March 7 
Rudi Dutschke, German radical student leader (d. 1979)
Viktor Savinykh, Soviet cosmonaut 
March 9 – Raul Julia, Puerto Rican actor (d. 1994)
March 10 – Chuck Norris, American actor, martial artist
March 12 – Al Jarreau, African-American singer (d. 2017)
March 13 – Candi Staton, American singer
March 16
Jan Pronk, Dutch politician, diplomat
James Wong Jim, Hong Kong composer (d. 2004)
March 20 – Paul Neville, Australian politician (d. 2019)
March 21 – Solomon Burke, African-American singer, songwriter (d. 2010)
March 22 – Haing S. Ngor, Cambodian actor (The Killing Fields) (d. 1996)
March 25
Anita Bryant, American entertainer
Mina, Italian singer
March 26
James Caan, American actor (d. 2022)
Nancy Pelosi, American politician; Speaker and Minority Leader (alternately) of the United States House of Representatives
March 27 – Marie Jepsen, Danish politician (d. 2018)
March 29
Ray Davis, African-American musician (P-Funk) (d. 2005)
Astrud Gilberto, Brazilian-born singer
March 30 – Jerry Lucas, American professional basketball player
March 31 – Patrick Leahy, American politician

April

April 1 – Wangari Maathai, Kenyan environmentalist, recipient of the Nobel Peace Prize (d. 2011)
April 2
Mike Hailwood, English motorcycle racer (d. 1981)
Dame Penelope Keith, English actress
April 4 – Robby Müller, Dutch cinematographer (d. 2018)
April 6 – Pedro Armendáriz Jr., Mexican actor (d. 2011)
April 8 – John Havlicek, American basketball player (d. 2019)
April 12 – Herbie Hancock, African-American pianist, keyboardist, bandleader, composer and actor
April 13
J. M. G. Le Clézio, French writer and professor
Max Mosley, British motorsport boss (d. 2021)
José Nápoles, Cuban-born Mexican boxer (d. 2019)
April 14 
Julie Christie, English actress
Countess Marie Kinsky of Wchinitz and Tettau (d. 2021) 
April 15
Faimalaga Luka, 6th Prime Minister of Tuvalu (d. 2005)
Robert Walker, American actor (d. 2019)
Yossef Romano, Israeli weightlifter (d. 1972)
April 16
 David Holford, Barbadian cricketer (d. 2022)
 Queen Margrethe II of Denmark
April 17 – John McCririck, English horse racing pundit (d. 2019)
April 18
Ira von Furstenberg, European socialite and actress
Joseph L. Goldstein, American scientist, recipient of the Nobel Prize in Physiology or Medicine
Ken Shellito, English footballer, manager (d. 2018) 
April 19 – Reinhard Bonnke, German Pentecostal evangelist (d. 2019)
April 20 – Pilar Miró, Spanish screenwriter and film director (d. 1997)
April 22 – Marie-José Nat, French actress (d. 2019)
April 23 – Danilo Astori, Uruguayan politician, 15th Vice President of Uruguay
April 24 – Sue Grafton, American detective novelist (d. 2017)
April 25
Al Pacino, American actor, film director
Tristram Powell, English television director, film director, writer and producer
April 26 
Tan Cheng Bock,  Singaporean politician
Giorgio Moroder, Italian film composer
April 30
Burt Young, American actor, author and painter
Ermindo Onega, Argentine footballer (d. 1979)

May

May 1 – Elsa Peretti, Italian jewelry designer (d. 2021)
May 2
Manuel Esquivel, Belizean politician, 2nd Prime Minister of Belize (d. 2022)
Hariton Pushwagner, Norwegian artist (d. 2018)
May 3 
 David Koch, American businessman (d. 2019)
 Oemarsono, Indonesian civil servant and politician (d. 2022)
May 5 – Lance Henriksen, American actor
May 7
Angela Carter, English author, editor (d. 1992)
May 8
Peter Benchley, American author (Jaws) (d. 2006)
Emilio Delgado, American actor (Sesame Street), singer and activist (d. 2022)
Ricky Nelson, American singer (d. 1985)
Toni Tennille, American pop singer
May 9 – James L. Brooks, American film producer, writer
May 11 – Juan Downey, Chilean-born American video artist (d. 1993)
May 13 
Bruce Chatwin, British author (d. 1989)
Oliver Lozano, Filipino lawyer, politician (d. 2018)
May 15
Lainie Kazan, American actress, singer
Don Nelson, American basketball player and coach
May 16 – Ole Ernst, Danish actor (d. 2013)
May 17
Adel Emam, Egyptian actor and comedian
Alan Kay, American computer scientist
Reynato Puno, Filipino Supreme Court Chief Justice
May 19 – Jan Janssen, Dutch cyclist
May 20
Shorty Long, African-American soul music singer, songwriter, musician and record producer (Here Comes The Judge) (d. 1969)
Stan Mikita, Slovakian-born Canadian hockey player (d. 2018)
Sadaharu Oh, Japanese baseball player
May 22 – Bernard Shaw, African-American journalist and television news reporter (d. 2022)
May 24 – Joseph Brodsky, Russian-born poet, Nobel Prize laureate (d. 1996)
May 26 – Levon Helm, American musician and actor (d. 2012)
May 27 – Sotsha Dlamini, 5th Prime Minister of Swaziland (d. 2017)
May 29 – Farooq Leghari, 8th President of Pakistan (d. 2010)

June

June 1
René Auberjonois, American screen actor (d. 2019)
Kip Thorne, American gravitational physicist, Nobel Prize laureate
June 2 – Constantine II of Greece (d. 2023)
June 4 – Ludwig Schwarz, Austrian prelate 
June 7
Samuel Little, American serial killer (d. 2020)
Sir Tom Jones, Welsh singer
Ronald Pickup, English actor (d. 2021)
June 8 – Nancy Sinatra, American singer
June 9 – Barry McDonald, Papua New Guinea-Australian rugby union player (d. 2020)
June 13 – Bobby Freeman, American singer, songwriter (d. 2017)
June 14 – Jack Bannon, American actor (d. 2017)
June 16
Neil Goldschmidt, American politician, Governor of Oregon
Taylor Gun-Jin Wang, Chinese-American astronaut
Thea White, American voice actress (d. 2021)
June 17
George Akerlof, American economist, Nobel Prize laureate
Ali Saibou, 3rd President of Niger (d. 2011)
June 18 – Phillip E. Johnson, American lawyer and author (d. 2019)
June 20 
Eugen Drewermann, German theologian, activist and priest
John Mahoney, English-born American actor (d. 2018)
June 21 – Michael Ruse, British-Canadian philosopher
June 22
Egon Henninger, German swimmer
Abbas Kiarostami, Iranian film director, screenwriter and producer (d. 2016)
Dame Esther Rantzen, British broadcaster
June 23
Willie Wallace, Scottish football player, coach
Wilma Rudolph, American Olympic athlete (d. 1994)
June 24
Hope Cooke, American socialite, Queen Consort of Sikkim
Murali Mohan, Indian film actor, producer, politician and business executive
Walter Ofonagoro, Nigerian scholar, politician and businessman
Ian Ross, Australian newsreader (d. 2014)
Vittorio Storaro, Italian cinematographer
June 25 
Thomas Köhler, East German luger
Mary Beth Peil, American actress and singer
June 26
Lucinda Childs, American actress, postmodern dancer and choreographer 
Jerry Fujio, Japanese singer, actor and tarento
June 27 – Anil Karanjai, Indian painter of the Hungry generation movement (d. 2001)
June 28
Karpal Singh, Malaysian politician, lawyer (d. 2014)
Muhammad Yunus, Bangladeshi founder of Grameen Bank, Nobel Prize laureate
June 29 – Vyacheslav Artyomov, Russian composer
June 30 – Neelo, Indian actress

July

July 1
Fukunohana Koichi, Japanese sumo wrestler
Craig Brown, Scottish footballer, manager
Abdul Razzak Ahmed, Iraqi football player
Wathiq Naji, Iraqi football manager
July 2 
Joshua Bryant, American actor, director, author and speaker
Ruriko Asaoka, Japanese actress
July 3
Lamar Alexander, American politician
Fontella Bass, African-American soul singer ("Rescue Me") (d. 2012)
Jerzy Buzek, Polish politician, 8th Prime Minister of Poland
Jose Alberto Laboy, Puerto Rican Major League Baseball player
Lance Larson, American competition swimmer, Olympic champion and world record-holder in four events
Chuck Sieminski, American football player
César Tovar, Venezuelan baseball player (d. 1994)
Mario Zanin, Italian cyclist
July 4 
Deidre Catt, English tennis player
Nasser Madani, Iranian fencer
Gene McDowell, American college football coach
Pat Stapleton, Canadian ice hockey player
July 5 – Reiko Kusamura, Japanese actress
July 6
Pablo Dabezies, Uruguayan priest and theologian
Nursultan Nazarbayev, 1st President of Kazakhstan
Jeannie Seely, American singer-songwriter
Siti Norma Yaakob, Malaysian lawyer and judge 
July 7
Lee Keun-hak, North Korean football player
Sir Ringo Starr, English musician, singer, songwriter and actor (The Beatles)
Irène Sweyd, Belgian swimmer
July 9 – Herminia Roman, Filipino politician
July 10
Gene Alley, American baseball player
Jim Cadile, American professional football offensive guard
Helen Donath, American soprano
Lofty Drews, Kenyan rally co-driver
Sir Tom Farmer, Scottish entrepreneur
Julie Payne, American actress (d. 2019)
David C. Schutter, American attorney (d. 2005)
Tommy Troelsen, Danish footballer, manager and television presenter
July 11
Rufus Ada George, Nigerian politician 
Anita Wall, Swedish actress
July 13
Paul Prudhomme, American celebrity chef, cookbook author (d. 2015)
Sir Patrick Stewart, English actor (Star Trek: The Next Generation)
July 15 – Johnny Seay, American country music singer (d. 2016)
July 16
Lofty Drews, Kenyan rally co-driver
Tom Metcalf, American baseball pitcher 
July 17
Verne Lundquist, American sportscaster
Tim Brooke-Taylor, English comic performer (d. 2020)
Francisco Toledo, Mexican painter, sculptor and graphic artist (d. 2019)
July 18
James Brolin, American actor, director
Peter Mutharika, 5th President of Malawi
Joe Torre, American baseball player, manager
July 19 
Hanako, Princess Hitachi
Vikki Carr, American singer
Anzor Kavazashvili, Soviet football goalkeeper
July 22 
Prince Sixtus Henry of Bourbon-Parma
Alex Trebek, Canadian game show host (Jeopardy!) (d. 2020)
July 23 – Don Imus, American radio personality, television show host and author (d. 2019)
July 24
Stanley Hauerwas, American theologian
Dan Hedaya, American actor
July 26
Dobie Gray, African-American singer-songwriter (Drift Away) (d. 2011)
Mary Jo Kopechne, American aide to Ted Kennedy (d. 1969)
July 27
Gary Kurtz, American filmmaker (d. 2018)
Pina Bausch, German choreographer (d. 2009)
Bharati Mukherjee, Indian-born novelist (d. 2017)
July 29 – Bernard Lafayette, African-American civil rights activist
July 30 – Clive Sinclair, English inventor (d. 2021)
July 31 – Roy Walker, Northern Irish comedian

August

August 1 – Ram Loevy, Israeli screenwriter, director
August 3 – Martin Sheen, American actor, father of Charlie Sheen
August 7 
Jean-Luc Dehaene, Prime Minister of Belgium (d. 2014)
Thomas Barlow, American politician (d. 2017)
August 8 – Dilip Sardesai, Indian cricketer (d. 2007)
August 10 – Bobby Hatfield, American singer (The Righteous Brothers) (d. 2003)
August 12 – Tony Allen, Nigerian Afrobeat drummer (d. 2020)
August 13 
Dirk Sager, German journalist (d. 2014)
Tony Cloninger, American baseball player (d. 2018)
August 14
Galen Hall, American football coach
Max Schautzer, Austrian-born German radio, television presenter
August 17 – Joseph Pairin Kitingan, Malaysian politician, Chief Minister Of Sabah
August 19 
Johnny Nash, American singer-songwriter (d. 2020)
Jill St. John, American actress
August 20
Musa Geshaev, Chechen poet, historian (d. 2014)
Rubén Hinojosa, American politician
Rajendra K. Pachauri, Indian scientist (d. 2020)
John Waller, English historical European martial arts (HEMA) revival pioneer and fight director (d. 2018)
August 23 
Tom Baker, American actor (d. 1982)
Maria Teresa Fontela Goulart, First Lady of Brazil
Richard Sanders, American actor
Thomas A. Steitz, American biochemist (d. 2018)
August 25 – José van Dam, Belgian bass-baritone
August 26
Don LaFontaine, American voice actor (d. 2008)
Michel Micombero, 1st President of Burundi (d. 1983)
August 27
Fernest Arceneaux, American musician (d. 2008)
Sonny Sharrock, American jazz musician (d. 1994)
August 28 – Joseph Shabalala, South African choral director (Ladysmith Black Mambazo) (d. 2020)
August 29 – Wim Ruska, Dutch wrestler, martial artist (d. 2015)
August 31
Wilton Felder, American saxophonist, bassist (d. 2015)
Jack Thompson, Australian actor

September

September 1
Yaşar Büyükanıt, Turkish military officer (d. 2019)
Annie Ernaux, French author, Nobel Prize laureate
September 3
Eduardo Galeano, Uruguayan writer (d. 2015)
Joseph Warioba, 5th Prime Minister of Tanzania
September 5 – Raquel Welch, American actress (d. 2023)
September 6
Elwyn Berlekamp, American mathematician (d. 2019)
Jackie Trent, English singer-songwriter, actress (d. 2015)
September 7
Dario Argento, Italian filmmaker
Abdurrahman Wahid, 4th President of Indonesia (d. 2009)
September 10
Roy Ayers, African-American musician, songwriter
David Mann, American artist (d. 2004)
September 11
Brian De Palma, American film director
Ajit Singh, Indian-born economist (d. 2015)
September 12
Joachim Frank, German-born biophysicist, Nobel Prize laureate
Linda Gray, American model, actress (Dallas)
Skip Hinnant, American actor
Mickey Lolich, American baseball player
September 13 – Óscar Arias, Costa Rican politician, twice President of Costa Rica, Nobel Peace Prize laureate
September 14
Larry Brown, American basketball player, coach
Barbara Greenwood, Canadian educator and children's author 
September 18 – Frankie Avalon, American singer and actor
September 19 – Paul Williams, American songwriter, singer and actor
September 20 – Tarō Asō, 59th Prime Minister of Japan
September 22 – Anna Karina, Danish-French actress (d. 2019)
September 23
Mohammad-Reza Shajarian, Iranian traditional singer (d. 2020)
Michel Temer, Brazilian politician, President of Brazil between 2016 and 2018.
September 24 – Michiko Suganuma, Urushi Japanese lacquer artist

October

October 1
Chris Pattikawa, Indonesian film director and producer (d. 2020) 
Jean-Luc Bideau, Swiss actor
October 3 –
Alan O'Day, American singer, songwriter (d. 2013)
Mike Troy, American swimmer (d. 2019)
October 4 – Ian Kiernan, Australian yachtsman (d. 2018)
October 5 – Milena Dravić, Serbian actress (d. 2018)
October 9 – John Lennon, English musician, singer (The Beatles) (d. 1980)
October 13 – Pharoah Sanders, American saxophonist (d. 2022)
October 14 – Cliff Richard, British pop musician, actor and philanthropist
October 15 – Peter Doherty, Australian immunologist, recipient of the Nobel Prize in Physiology or Medicine
October 16
Barry Corbin, American actor
Dave DeBusschere, American basketball player and coach, baseball player (d. 2003)
October 17 – Peter Stringfellow, English businessman, nightclub owner (d. 2018)
October 18 – Győző Kulcsár, Hungarian fencer (d. 2018)
October 19 – Sir Michael Gambon, British-Irish actor
October 20 – Robert Pinsky, American poet, essayist, literary critic and translator, United States Poet Laureate
October 21
Geoffrey Boycott, English cricketer
Manfred Mann, South African rock musician 
Marita Petersen, 8th Prime Minister of Faroe Islands (d. 2001)
October 23 – Pelé, Brazilian footballer (d. 2022)
October 24 – Yossi Sarid, Israeli politician (d. 2015)
October 25
Bob Knight, American basketball player and coach
Apolo Nsibambi, Ugandan politician, 8th Prime Minister of Uganda (d. 2019)
October 27 – John Gotti, American gangster (d. 2002)
October 28 – Jack Shepherd, English actor
October 29 
Frida Boccara, French singer (d. 1996)
Princess Lalla Nuzha, princess of Morocco (d. 1977)
October 30 – Hidetoshi Nagasawa, Japanese sculptor, architect (d. 2018)

November

November 5 – Jaime Roldós Aguilera, 33rd President of Ecuador (1979-1981) (d. 1981)
November 12 – Donald Wuerl, American archbishop
November 15
Wolf Biermann, German singer, songwriter and East German dissident
Roberto Cavalli, Italian designer
Sam Waterston, American actor
November 17 – Luke Kelly, Irish ballad singer (d. 1984)
November 18 – Qaboos bin Said, Sultan of Oman (d. 2020)
November 20 – Helma Sanders-Brahms, German film director (d. 2014)
November 21 – Richard Marcinko, U.S. Navy SEAL team member, author (d. 2021)
November 22
Alberto Fouilloux, Chilean footballer (d. 2018)
Terry Gilliam, American-born British screenwriter, director and animator (Monty Python's Flying Circus)
Andrzej Żuławski, Polish film director, writer (d. 2016)
November 25 – Joe Gibbs, American football coach
November 27 – Bruce Lee, Chinese-American martial artist, actor (d. 1973)
November 29 – Chuck Mangione, American flugelhorn player

December

December 1 
Richard Pryor, American stand-up comedian, actor and writer (d. 2005)
Mário da Graça Machungo, 1st Prime Minister of Mozambique (d. 2020)
 December 2 – Connie Booth, British actress
December 4 – Gary Gilmore, American murderer (d. 1977)
December 11
David Gates, American singer-songwriter (Bread)
Donna Mills, American actress 
December 12
Sharad Pawar, Indian politician
Dionne Warwick, African-American singer and actress
December 19 – Phil Ochs, American protest singer (d. 1976)
December 21 – Frank Zappa, American musician, composer and satirist (d. 1993)
December 23
Mamnoon Hussain, 12th President of Pakistan (d. 2021)
Jorma Kaukonen, American musician (Jefferson Airplane)
December 24 
Janet Carroll, American actress, singer (d. 2012)
Anthony S. Fauci, American immunologist 
Jan Stráský, 20th Prime Minister of Czechoslovakia (d. 2019)
December 25 – Alija Behmen, Bosnian politician (d. 2018)
December 26 – Edward C. Prescott, American economist, Nobel Prize laureate (d. 2022)
December 28 – Don Francisco, Chilean-American television host
December 29 
Fred Hansen, American Olympic athlete
Brigitte Kronauer, German novelist (d. 2019)
December 30 - James Burrows, American television director
Philippe Cousteau, French diver and cinematographer (d. 1979)

Deaths

January
January 1 – Fusajiro Yamauchi, Japanese business executive (b. 1859)
January 4 – Flora Finch, English-born actress, comedian (b. 1867)
January 9 – Alex Bennett, Scottish footballer (b. 1881)
January 15 – Kallirhoe Parren, founder of the Greek women's movement (b. 1861)
January 18 – Kazimierz Przerwa-Tetmajer, Polish poet, writer (b. 1865)
January 20 – Omar Bundy, U.S. Army General (b. 1861)
January 22 – Edwin Carewe, Native American director (b. 1883)
January 27 – Isaac Babel, Ukrainian writer (executed) (b. 1894)

February

February – Zheng Pingru, Chinese spy (executed) (b. 1918)
February 1 – Philip Francis Nowlan, American science fiction writer, creator of Buck Rogers (b. 1888)
February 2
Mikhail Koltsov, Soviet journalist (executed) (b. 1898)
Vsevolod Meyerhold, Russian theatre practitioner (b. 1874)
February 4
Samuel M. Vauclain, American engineer (b. 1856)
Nikolai Yezhov, Soviet politician and police chief, Great Purge Perpetrator (b. 1895)
February 9 – William Dodd, American historian, diplomat (b. 1869)
February 11
John Buchan, 1st Baron Tweedsmuir, Scottish-born novelist, Governor General of Canada (b. 1875)
Gunnar Höckert, Finnish Olympic athlete (b. 1910)
February 15 – R. E. B. Crompton, British electrical engineer, industrialist and inventor (b. 1845)
February 16 – Louis Dartige du Fournet, French admiral (b. 1856)
February 26 – Michael Hainisch, 2nd President of Austria (b. 1858)
February 27 – Peter Behrens, German architect, designer (b. 1868)
February 29 
E. F. Benson, English writer (b. 1867)
Josef Swickard, German actor (b. 1866)

March

March 1 – A. H. Tammsaare, Estonian writer (b. 1878)
March 5
Maxine Elliott, American actress (b. 1868)
Cai Yuanpei, Chinese educator, philosopher, politician and Esperantist and the president of Peking University (b. 1868)
March 10 – Mikhail Bulgakov, Russian writer (b. 1891)
March 16
Selma Lagerlöf, Swedish writer, Nobel Prize laureate (b. 1858)
Samuel Untermyer, American lawyer (b. 1858) 
March 18 – Sir Aylmer Hunter-Weston, British army general (b. 1864)
March 20 – Alfred Ploetz, German physician, biologist and eugenicist (b. 1860)
March 23 – Dimitar Stanchov, 15th Prime Minister of Bulgaria (b. 1863)
March 24 – Thomas Adams, British urban planner (b. 1871)
March 26 – Spyridon Louis, Greek Olympic athlete (b. 1873)
March 27
Madeleine Astor, American survivor of the sinking of the RMS Titanic (b. 1893)
Michael Joseph Savage, 23rd Prime Minister of New Zealand (b. 1872)
March 30 – Sir George Egerton, British admiral (b. 1852)
March 31 – Tinsley Lindley, English footballer (b. 1865)

April

April 1 – J. A. Hobson, English economist (b. 1858)
April 5 
Robert Maillart, Swiss civil engineer (b. 1872)
Song Zheyuan, Chinese general of the Northwestern Army (b. 1885)
April 7 – William Faversham, English actor (b. 1868)
April 8 – Joaquin Mir Trinxet, Spanish artist (b. 1873)
April 9 
Mrs. Patrick Campbell, English theatre actress, producer (b. 1865)
Henryk Minkiewicz, Polish general and politician (executed) (b. 1880)
April 10 – Bernard Warburton-Lee, British naval officer, Victoria Cross recipient (killed in action) (b. 1895)
April 18 – Florrie Forde, Australian-born music hall singer (b. 1875)
April 21 – George Barnes, British Labour politician (b. 1859)
April 26 – Carl Bosch, German chemist, Nobel Prize laureate (b. 1874)
April 28 – Luisa Tetrazzini, Italian opera singer (b. 1871)
April 30 – Henryk Dobrzański, Polish soldier, sportsman and resistance fighter (b. 1897)

May

May 2 – Ernest Joyce, English explorer (b. 1875)
May 7 – George Lansbury, British Labour politician (b. 1859)
May 11 – Chujiro Hayashi, Japanese Reiki Master (b. 1880)
May 14 – Emma Goldman, Lithuanian-born anarchist (b. 1869)
May 15 – Menno ter Braak, Dutch writer (b. 1902)
May 16 – Zhang Zizhong, general of the Chinese National Revolutionary Army (b. 1891)
May 19 – Diego Mazquiarán, Spanish matador (b. 1895)
May 20 – Verner von Heidenstam, Swedish writer, Nobel Prize laureate (b. 1859)
May 24 – Louis Fles, Dutch businessman, activist and author (b. 1872)
May 25 – Joe De Grasse, Canadian film director (b. 1873)
May 26 – Prince Wilhelm of Prussia (b. 1906)
May 27 – Bolesław Roja, Polish general (executed) (b. 1876)
May 28
Prince Frederick Charles of Hesse (b. 1868)
Walter Connolly, American actor (b. 1887)
May 29 – Mary Anderson, American stage actress (b. 1859)

June

June 7
James Hall, American actor (b. 1900)
Hugh Rodman, American admiral (b. 1859)
June 10 
Marcus Garvey, Jamaican-born publisher, entrepreneur and black nationalist (b. 1887)
Sir Thomas Hudson Beare, British engineer (b. 1859)
June 11 – Alfred S. Alschuler, American architect (b. 1876)
June 13 – George Fitzmaurice, American director (b. 1885)
June 12 - William Lashly, English sailor (b. 1867)
June 14 – Henry W. Antheil Jr., American diplomat (b. 1912)
June 17 – Sir Arthur Harden, English chemist, Nobel Prize laureate (b. 1865)
June 19 – Maurice Jaubert, French composer (b. 1900)
June 20 – Charley Chase, American comedian (b. 1893)
June 21
Smedley Butler, U.S. general (b. 1881)
Janusz Kusociński, Polish athlete (killed in action) (b. 1907)
John T. Thompson, United States Army officer, inventor of the Thompson gun (b. 1860)
Édouard Vuillard, French painter (b. 1868)
June 22 
Walter Hasenclever, German poet and playwright (b. 1890)
Wladimir Köppen, Russian-born German geographer and climatologist (b. 1846)
June 15 – J. B. Johnson, American attorney and politician (b. 1868)
June 28 – Italo Balbo, Italian Fascist leader (b. 1896)
June 29 – Paul Klee, Swiss artist (b. 1879)

July
July 1 – Ben Turpin, American actor, comedian (b. 1869)
July 9 – Józef Biniszkiewicz, Silesian politician (b. 1875)
July 10 – Pietro Frugoni, Italian general (b. 1851)
July 15 – Robert Wadlow, American citizen, tallest man ever (infection) (b. 1918)
July 28 – David W. Taylor, American naval architect (b. 1864)
July 30 – Spencer S. Wood, United States Navy Rear Admiral (b. 1861)

August

August 3
 Ze'ev Jabotinsky, Russian Zionist philosopher and intellectual (b. 1880)
 Krishna Raja Wadiyar IV, Indian royal, Maharajah of Mysore (b. 1884)
August 4 – Joaquina Maria Mercedes Barcelo Pages, Filipino Roman Catholic nun and venerable (b. 1857)
August 5 – Frederick Cook, American explorer (b. 1865)
August 8 – Johnny Dodds, American jazz clarinetist (b. 1892)
August 13
James Fairbairn, Australian pastoralist, aviator and politician (b. 1897)
Sir Henry Gullett, Australian politician (b. 1878)
Geoffrey Street, Australian politician (b. 1894)
Sir Brudenell White, Australian general (b. 1876)
August 16 – Henri Desgrange, French racing cyclist and founder of the Tour de France (b. 1865)
August 18 – Walter Chrysler, American automobile pioneer (b. 1875)
August 21 – Leon Trotsky, Russian communist revolutionary (assassinated) (b. 1879)
August 22
Sir Oliver Lodge, British physicist (b. 1851)
Gerald Strickland, 1st Baron Strickland, Maltese politician, 4th Prime Minister of Malta, 23rd Governor of New South Wales, 15th Governor of Western Australia and 9th Governor of Tasmania (b. 1861)
Mary Vaux Walcott, American artist, naturalist (b. 1860)
August 24 – Paul Gottlieb Nipkow, German technician and inventor (b. 1860)
August 28 – William Bowie, American geodetic engineer (b. 1872)
August 30
Sir Thomas Snow, British army general (b. 1858)
J. J. Thomson, British physicist, Nobel Prize laureate (b. 1856)
August 31 – Ernest Lundeen, American lawyer, politician (b. 1878)

September

September 4 – George William de Carteret, Jerseiaise author (b. 1869)
September 5 – Charles de Broqueville, 20th Prime Minister of Belgium (b. 1860)
September 7 – José Félix Estigarribia, 34th President of Paraguay (b. 1888)
September 9 - Percy Abbott, Australian politician (b. 1869)
September 10 – Nikola Ivanov, Bulgarian general (b. 1861)
September 20 - E. Rosa Sawtell, New Zealand artist (b. 1865)
September 23 
 Robert Hichens, RMS Titanic quartermaster, man at the wheel when Titanic hit the iceberg (b. 1882)
 Hale Holden, American president of Chicago, Burlington and Quincy Railroad (1914–1918, 1920–1929) (b. 1869)
September 25 – Marguerite Clark, American stage and silent film actress (b. 1883)
September 26 – Walter Benjamin, German philosopher and cultural critic, suicide (b. 1892)
September 27
Julián Besteiro, Spanish socialist politician (b. 1870)
Julius Wagner-Jauregg, Austrian neuroscientist, recipient of the Nobel Prize in Physiology or Medicine (b. 1857)

October
October 5
Ballington Booth, American co-founder of Volunteers of America (b. 1857)
Lincoln Loy McCandless, Hawaiian politician, cattle rancher (b. 1859)
Silvestre Revueltas, Mexican composer (b. 1899)
October 6 – Michitarō Komatsubara, Japanese general (b. 1885)
October 8
Robert Emden, Swiss astrophysicist and meteorologist (b. 1862)
Sir Henry Head, English neurologist (b. 1861)
October 9 – Sir Wilfred Grenfell, English medical missionary to Newfoundland and Labrador (b. 1865)
October 10 – Berton Churchill, Canadian actor (b. 1876)
October 12 – Tom Mix, American actor (b. 1880)
October 15 – Lluís Companys, President of the Generalitat of Catalonia (executed) (b. 1882)
October 17 – George Davis, American baseball player, MLB Hall of Famer (b. 1870)
October 20 – Gunnar Asplund, Swedish architect (b. 1885)
October 22 – Sir Charles Harington, British general (b. 1872)

November

November 3 – Manuel Azaña, 55th Prime Minister of Spain, 2nd President of Spain (b. 1880)
November 5 – Otto Plath, American father of poet Sylvia Plath, entomologist (b. 1885)
November 9
Neville Chamberlain, Prime Minister of the United Kingdom (b. 1869)
John Henry Kirby, American businessman, Texas legislator (b. 1860)
November 11 – Vladimir Vinnichevsky, Russian serial killer (executed) (b. 1923)
November 17
Eric Gill, English sculptor, lettering designer and writer (b. 1882)
Raymond Pearl, American biologist (b. 1879)
November 18 – Ion Inculeț, Moldavian politician, 1st President of Moldova (b. 1884)
November 19
Ralph W. Barnes, American journalist (b. 1899)
Charles W. Woodworth, American entomologist (b. 1865)
November 24 – Saionji Kinmochi, Japanese prince and prime minister (b. 1849)
November 26 – assassinations
Gheorghe Argeșanu, Romanian general and politician, 40th Prime Minister of Romania (b. 1883)
Ioan Bengliu, Romanian general (b. 1881)
Victor Iamandi, Romanian politician (b. 1891)
Mihail Moruzov, Romanian intelligence chief (b. 1887)
November 27
Henri Guillaumet, French aviator (b. 1902)
Nicolae Iorga, Romanian historian and politician, 34th Prime Minister of Romania (assassinated) (b. 1871)

December

December 2 – Nikolai Koltsov, Russian biologist, genetist (b. 1872)
December 5 – Jan Kubelík, Czech violinist (b. 1880)
December 13 – Wilfred Lucas, Canadian-born American actor (b. 1871)
December 14 – Anton Korošec, Slovenian political leader (b. 1872)
December 15 – Billy Hamilton, American baseball player, MLB Hall of Famer (b. 1866)
December 16 – Eugène Dubois, Dutch paleoanthropologist, geologist (b. 1858)
December 19 – Kyösti Kallio, Finnish farmerman, banker, 8th Prime Minister of Finland and 4th President of Finland (b. 1873)
December 21 – F. Scott Fitzgerald, American writer (b. 1896)
December 22 – Nathanael West, American writer (b. 1903)
December 23 – Eddie August Schneider, American aviator (b. 1911)
December 25 – Agnes Ayres, American actress (b. 1898)
December 26 – Daniel Frohman, American theater producer (b. 1851)

Nobel Prizes

Physics – not awarded
Chemistry – not awarded
Physiology or Medicine – not awarded
Literature – not awarded
Peace – not awarded

References

Further reading
Bloch, Leon Bryce and Lamar Middleton, ed. The World Over in 1940 (1941) detailed coverage of world events online free; 914pp

External links
1940 WWII Timeline
The 1930s Timeline: 1940 – from American Studies Programs at The University of Virginia
The 1940s | 1940-1949 | History Fashion Movies Music 

 
Leap years in the Gregorian calendar